József Tóth (16 May 1929 – 9 October 2017), was a Hungarian footballer, position forward, who played in the 1954 FIFA World Cup.

The player from Csepeli Vasas, today known as Csepel SC played between 1953 and 1956 12 times for the Hungarian national football team and scored 5 goals in the process. He also took part in the 1954 World Cup campaign of the Magic Magyars. In this tournament he played twice and scored one goal. However, he was not part of the line-up for the final. He was the last surviving member of the squad.

As manager, he developed his career in Spain and adcquired the Spanish nationality. He started in Regional Preferente in the seventies, and reached Segunda División B in the eighties with Club Deportivo Badajoz, Gimnásitca Arandina, Marino de Luanco and Tomelloso CF. The clubs he managed were, among others, Club Deportivo Leganés, CD Pegaso, AD Ceuta, Talavera CF and CD Colonia Moscardó.

References

1929 births
2017 deaths
Hungarian footballers
Hungary international footballers
1954 FIFA World Cup players
Association football forwards
CD Leganés managers
Sportspeople from Vas County